Alison Yu Chui Yee (born 29 March 1984) is a wheelchair fencer from Hong Kong. When she was 11 years old, she had  bone cancer, leading to the amputation of her left leg. She began as a swimmer but switched to fencing at the age of 17. At the 2004 Summer Paralympics, she won four gold medals in both the individual and team events of épée and foil. She was the first athlete to win four gold medals in fencing in category A in 2004. At the 2008 Summer Paralympics, she represented Hong Kong again, but since the team matches were canceled, she only won one gold and one silver medal in the individual events.

Career 
Yui Chui Yee first made her Paralympic games debut representing Hong Kong in the 2004 Summer Paralympic Games in Athens. Yu won four gold medals in wheelchair fencing in category A individual foil, team foil, individual épée, and team épée, becoming the first athlete to win four gold medals in fencing.

In the 2008 Summer Paralympics in Beijing, Yu won gold in the Individual foil category A, and earned silver in the Individual épée category A, being bested by Zhang Chuncui, representing China. However, in the London 2012 Summer Paralympics, Yu took home gold medals in both individual épée category A and individual foil category A. She also earned a bronze medal in the open category team épée alongside teammates Chan Yui Chong and Fan Pui Shan.

During the 2016 Rio Paralympic Games, Yu secured a silver medal in category A individual foil and in team épée with teammates Chan Yui Chong and Ng Justine Charissa.

Personal life 
In addition to attaining 7 Paralympic gold medals, Yu Chui Yee is also a radio host, a columnist on the official paralympic movement website, and even a co-founder of the Fencing Sport Academy for young children and teenagers. In her spare time, Yu stated she is an avid swimmer, runner, and even plans to take up scuba diving and paragliding.

Following her Paralympic debut in the 2004 Paralympic games in Athens, Yu was granted admission into the Chinese University of Hong Kong's Department of Geography and Resource Management where she obtained her MA in Sports Studies.

References

External links
 

1984 births
Living people
Hong Kong female épée fencers
Paralympic wheelchair fencers of Hong Kong
Paralympic gold medalists for Hong Kong
Paralympic silver medalists for Hong Kong
Paralympic bronze medalists for Hong Kong
Wheelchair fencers at the 2004 Summer Paralympics
Wheelchair fencers at the 2008 Summer Paralympics
Wheelchair fencers at the 2012 Summer Paralympics
Paralympic medalists in wheelchair fencing
Medalists at the 2004 Summer Paralympics
Medalists at the 2008 Summer Paralympics
Medalists at the 2012 Summer Paralympics
Chinese amputees
Hong Kong female foil fencers